Geolsa Biu was a 7th-century military leader of Baishan Mohe ancestry. Geolsa Biu took an active part in Balhae's effort for autonomy against the Tang Dynasty. Geolsa Biu died in the Battle of Tianmenling, in which Balhae achieved victory and declared autonomy.

In popular culture
 Portrayed by Choi Cheol-ho in the 2006-2007 KBS TV series Dae Jo Yeong.

See also
Baishan Mohe
Balhae
Dae Jung-sang
Go of Balhae

Balhae
Tungusic peoples
Mohe peoples
History of Manchuria